Cathkin High School is a state secondary school in Cambuslang, South Lanarkshire (Greater Glasgow), Scotland.

History
The original school was built at a cost of £1.25million and opened in November 1970 (official duties being performed by politician Peggy Herbison), around the same time as the neighbouring housing scheme at Whitlawburn was completed. It replaced Gateside School in central Cambuslang (the campus of which was thereafter occupied by Trinity High School then by South Lanarkshire College, before being demolished in 2008).

In 2008, the school relocated to a new campus (also accommodating a nursery and a special school, Rutherglen High School) on a site previously used designated as the school's playing fields situated immediately north of its original buildings, which were subsequently demolished and redeveloped for housing (the Cathkin Rise estate by Barratt).

 the school had 1004 pupils on the school roll and 88 Full-time equivalent staff.  

In May 2018, the school won the Scottish Senior Boys Shield in football for the first time, after beating St Ninian's High School, Giffnock on penalties in the final.

Recently the school made local headlines due to the new managements decisions to not hold proper 'prelims'. Cathkin High pupils argued that the assessments that were being held did not accurately depict the exams that they would be sitting at the end of the year.
Due to Covid-19 teens all around the world haven't been allowed to sit proper exams, the pupils felt like they would be at a huge disadvantage compared to other schools which were holding December assessments in an 'exam style'.

Houses

Cathkin uses a house system. The school is split into five houses and they are:

Burns
Carnegie
Kelvin
Livingston
Telford

Feeder Schools
Cairns Primary (Halfway), Cathkin Primary (Cathkin/Fernhill), Hallside Primary (Drumsagard Village), Loch Primary (Whitlawburn / Springhall), West Coats Primary (Cambuslang / Kirkhill).

Notable former pupils and teachers

Notable former pupils include:
Darren Young, footballer (Aberdeen, Dunfermline Athletic, Scotland u21) and manager (Albion Rovers, Alloa Athletic)
Derek Young, footballer (also Aberdeen, Dunfermline and Scotland u21 plus Partick Thistle), brother of Darren
Duncan Weir, professional rugby union player (Glasgow Warriors, Edinburgh, Scotland)
Kenny McLean professional footballer (St Mirren, Aberdeen, Norwich City, Scotland)

References

External links

 
 profile on Education Scotland's Parentzone

Secondary schools in South Lanarkshire
Buildings and structures in Cambuslang
Educational institutions established in 1970
1970 establishments in Scotland
School buildings completed in 2008
Buildings and structures demolished in 2009
Rutherglen